Chatham County is located in the U.S. state of Georgia, on the state's Atlantic coast. The county seat and largest city is Savannah. One of the original counties of Georgia, Chatham County was created February 5, 1777, and is named after William Pitt, 1st Earl of Chatham.

The U.S. Census Bureau's official 2020 population for Chatham County was 295,291 residents. This was an increase of 11.4% from the official 2010 population of 265,128 residents. Chatham is the sixth most populous county in Georgia, and the most populous Georgia county outside the Atlanta metropolitan area.  Chatham is the core county of the Savannah metropolitan area.

Geography

Chatham County is the northernmost of Georgia's coastal counties on the Atlantic Ocean. It is bounded on the northeast by the Savannah River, and in the southwest bounded by the Ogeechee River.

The bulk of Chatham County, an area with a northern border in a line from Bloomingdale to Tybee Island, is located in the Ogeechee River Coastal subbasin of the Ogeechee River basin. The portion of the county north of that line is located in the lower Savannah River subbasin of the Savannah River basin, while the very southern fringes of the Chatham County are located in the lower Ogeechee River subbasin of the Ogeechee River basin.

Major highways

  Interstate 16
  Interstate 95
  Interstate 516
  U.S. Route 17
  U.S. Route 80
  State Route 17
  State Route 21
  State Route 21 Spur
  State Route 25
  State Route 26
 State Route 26 Connector
  State Route 30
  State Route 204
  State Route 204 Spur
  State Route 307
  State Route 404 (unsigned designation for I-16)
  State Route 404 Spur
  State Route 405 (unsigned designation for I-95)
  State Route 421 (unsigned designation for I-516)
  Savannah River Parkway

Adjacent counties
 Jasper County, South Carolina – northeast
 Bryan County – west/southwest
 Liberty County - southeast
 Effingham County – northwest

National protected areas
 Fort Pulaski National Monument
 Savannah National Wildlife Refuge (part)
 Wassaw National Wildlife Refuge

Demographics

2020 census

As of the 2020 United States census, there were 295,291 people, 107,987 households, and 65,889 families residing in the county.

2010 census
As of the 2010 United States Census,  265,128 people, 103,038 households, and 64,613 families were residing in the county. The racial makeup of the county was 52.8% White, 40.1%  African American, 2.4% Asian, 0.3% American Indian,  2.3% from other races, and 2.1% from two or more races. Hispanics or Latinos made up 5.4% of the population. In ancestry, 9.8% were Irish, 8.7% were English, 7.9% were German, and 4.6% were American.

Of the 103,038 households, 31.3% had children under  18 living with them, 41.0% were married couples living together, 17.5% had a female householder with no husband present, 37.3% were not families; 28.7% of all households were made up of individuals. The average household size was 2.45, and the average family size was 3.03. The median age was 34.0 years.

The median income for a household in the county was $44,928 and for a family was $54,933. Males had a median income of $42,239 versus $31,778 for females. The per capita income for the county was $25,397. About 11.6% of families and 16.6% of the population were below the poverty line, including 23.4% of those under age 18 and 10.8% of those age 65 or over.

Education

Public schools are operated by Savannah-Chatham County Public Schools. The entire county is in the district.

Libraries
The Live Oak Public Libraries constitute a regional library system that provides services to three Georgia counties: Chatham, Effingham, and Liberty.  The former name of the system, "Chatham Effingham Liberty Regional Library," described this collaboration.  In 2002, the name was changed to Live Oak, which reflects the personality of the region, as well as the life and growth of its branches.
At the beginning of the 20th century, city leaders in Savannah began to discuss the need for a public library.  The history of libraries in Chatham County dates to 1903. According to Geraldine LeMay, former director of the Savannah Public Chatham-Effingham and Liberty Regional Library, the Georgia Historical Society and the city of Savannah worked out a plan that year to establish the Savannah Public Library. The idea was the brainchild of the Georgia Historical Society, which set up a planning committee to determine how the facilities of the society might best be useful to the city of Savannah.  In a joint meeting of committee members from the society and the city of Savannah, a free public library was established that would prove to be of great value to the community.  This library, however, did not serve citizens of color.

Government and infrastructure
The Coastal State Prison, a Georgia Department of Corrections state prison, is located in Savannah, near Garden City.

Chatham County is primarily served by the Chatham County Police Department (CCPD) and the Georgia State Patrol. The Chatham County Sheriff's Office is the enforcement arm of the county court system and operates the county jail. The department was formed on January 1, 2005, when the separate Savannah Police Department and Chatham County Police merged.

Communities

Municipalities

Cities

 Bloomingdale
 Garden City
 Pooler
 Port Wentworth
 Savannah
 Tybee Island

Towns
 Thunderbolt
 Vernonburg

Census-designated places

 Dutch Island
 Georgetown
 Henderson
 Isle of Hope
 Montgomery
 Skidaway Island
 Talahi Island
 Whitemarsh Island
 Wilmington Island

Other unincorporated communities
 Pin Point
 Sandfly

Politics
Chatham County was one of the earliest counties in Georgia to turn Republican and shake off its Solid South roots. From 1952 to 2000, the county went Republican all but four times. Hubert Humphrey carried it by 95 votes in 1968. Jimmy Carter won a majority in both of his runs for president, and in 1996, Bill Clinton became the first non-Georgian Democrat to win a majority since Franklin Roosevelt.

The county has voted majority Democratic in every presidential election since 2004, when John Kerry carried it by fewer than 150 votes. It swung dramatically to support Barack Obama in 2008, making Obama only the second non-Georgian Democrat to win a majority of the county's vote since Franklin Roosevelt. Since then, Chatham has tended to vote substantially more for the Democratic Party at the presidential level than the state as a whole. In the last four presidential elections, the Democrats have recorded the biggest margins for a non-Georgian Democrat since Roosevelt's landslides. This culminated in 2020, when Joe Biden took 58.6% of the vote, outdoing Carter's 57% in 1976.  Since 2008, it has been one of the most Democratic urban counties in the state outside of the Atlanta area, and one of the few Democratic pockets in mostly heavily Republican South Georgia. It is primarily an urban county, especially in its principal city of Savannah.

See also

 Georgia Senate, District 2
 National Register of Historic Places listings in Chatham County, Georgia
List of counties in Georgia

References

External links

 
 Documents from Chatham County at the Digital Library of Georgia

 
1777 establishments in Georgia (U.S. state)
Populated places established in 1777
Georgia (U.S. state) counties
Savannah metropolitan area
Majority-minority counties in Georgia
World War II Heritage Cities